Adilabad district is a district located in the northern region of Telangana, India. It is known as the gateway district to South and Central India. The town of Adilabad is its headquarters.  The district shares boundaries with Asifabad, Nirmal districts and with the state boundary of Maharashtra.

As of 2022, the district is a part of the red corridor.

History 

Historically, Adilabad was known as Edlabad during the rule of Qutub Shahis. The district was named for Ali Adil Shah, sultan of Bijapur.

The heavily forested Godavari basin was inhabited during the Mesolithic and Paleolithic periods. Excavations have taken place in the surrounding areas of Luxettipet, Asifabad, Boath, Bhainsa, and Nirmal.

The district was ruled at different times by different dynasties, including the Mauryas, Sathavahanas, Kakatiyas and Gond Rajas. Some Telugu inscriptions made during the time of the Kakatiya dynasty have been found in the Adilabad District, which indicates the historical importance of the area.

Due to the district's reorganization in October 2016, the erstwhile Adilabad district was divided into four districts: Adilabad district, Komaram Bheem Asifabad district, Mancherial district, and Nirmal district.

Geography 

The Adilabad district is located in the Telangana state of India. It is bordered to the north by Yavatmal district and Chandrapur district of Maharashtra, to the east by Komaram Bheem district, to the southeast by Mancherial district, to the south by Nirmal district, and to the west by Nanded district of the Maharashtra.

Demographics 
According to the Census of India, the residual Adilabad district has a population of 708,972, with a ratio of 989 females to 1000 males. 23.66% of the population lives in urban areas. The literacy rate is 63.46%. Scheduled Castes and Scheduled Tribes make up 99,422 (14.02%) and 224,622 (31.68%) of the population respectively.

Religions 

Badankurti village in Khanapur mandal of the erstwhile Adilabad district (now in Nirmal district) was explored and remnants of a Buddhist monastery were found on a small island of Godavari river near Badankurthi. The town of Bhainsa was probably related to early Buddhist times, as a pair of carved feet near a mound were found. The residual Adilabad district is Hindu dominated. Islam is the second largest religion, with the majority of Muslims living in urban areas. Buddhism, which has a long history in the district, is also present among the Marathis.

Language 

In the residual district, 36.50% of the population speaks Telugu, 19.67% Marathi, 17.23% Gondi, 10.23% Urdu, 7.10% Lambadi, 2.92% Kolami and 2.05% Hindi as their first language.

Ethnicities 
The major tribal groups in the area are the Adivasis: Gonds, Kolams, Pardhans, and Thotis. Adilabad is also known for Imran the Tree Maker.

Economy 
In 2006, the Indian government named Adilabad as one of the 250 most backward districts (out of a total of 640) in the country. It is one of the districts in the state of Telangana, currently receiving funds from the Backward Regions Grant Fund Programme (BRGF).

Administrative divisions 

The district is divided into two revenue divisions, Adilabad and Utnoor. These two divisions are sub-divided into 18 mandals. Sikta Patnaik is the current revenue collector for the district.

Mandals 

The below table categorizes 18 mandals into their respective revenue divisions in the district:

See also 
 List of districts in Telangana

References

External links 

 Adilabad district official website 

 
States and territories established in 1905
1905 establishments in India
Coal mining districts in India
Districts of Telangana